Redberry was a provincial electoral district for the Legislative Assembly of the province of Saskatchewan, Canada, centred on the town of Hafford. This constituency was one of 25 created before the 1st Saskatchewan general election in 1905. Dissolved in 1934, the district was reconstituted before the 9th Saskatchewan general election in 1938, and renamed "Redberry Lake" in 1995.

It is now part of the constituencies of Biggar and Rosthern-Shellbrook.

Members of the Legislative Assembly

1905 – 1934

1938 – 2003

Election results

|-

 
|Provincial Rights
|Samuel Alexander Hamilton
|align="right"|202
|align="right"|39.45%
|align="right"|–
|- bgcolor="white"
!align="left" colspan=3|Total
!align="right"|512
!align="right"|100.00%
!align="right"|

|-

 
|Provincial Rights
|Claude Percival Evans
|align="right"|483
|align="right"|44.80%
|align="right"|+5.35
|- bgcolor="white"
!align="left" colspan=3|Total
!align="right"|1,078
!align="right"|100.00%
!align="right"|

|-

 
|Conservative
|R.M. Pitts
|align="right"|520
|align="right"|33.90%
|align="right"|-10.90
|- bgcolor="white"
!align="left" colspan=3|Total
!align="right"|1,534
!align="right"|100.00%
!align="right"|

|-

|- bgcolor="white"
!align="left" colspan=3|Total
!align="right"|Acclamation
!align="right"|

|-

 
|Conservative
|John A. McKeen
|align="right"|1,029
|align="right"|31.58%
|align="right"|-

|Independent
|John Pitchko
|align="right"|83
|align="right"|2.55%
|align="right"|–
|- bgcolor="white"
!align="left" colspan=3|Total
!align="right"|3,258
!align="right"|100.00%
!align="right"|

|-

|style="width: 130px"|Independent
|George Cockburn
|align="right"|1,837
|align="right"|53.65%
|align="right"|+51.10

|- bgcolor="white"
!align="left" colspan=3|Total
!align="right"|3,424
!align="right"|100.00%
!align="right"|

|-

|- bgcolor="white"
!align="left" colspan=3|Total
!align="right"|3,609
!align="right"|100.00%
!align="right"|

 
|Conservative
|Samuel Robert Miller
|align="right"|1,021
|align="right"|23.32%

|- bgcolor="white"
!align="left" colspan=3|Total
!align="right"|4,378
!align="right"|100.00%

1938 – 2003

|-

|Independent
|Arnold Larsen
|align="right"|1,572
|align="right"|26.21%
|align="right"|-
|- bgcolor="white"
!align="left" colspan=3|Total
!align="right"|5,997
!align="right"|100.00%
!align="right"|

|-

|style="width: 130px"|CCF
|Dmytro Lazorko
|align="right"|2,306
|align="right"|52.99%
|align="right"|–

 
|Prog. Conservative
|Ernest Wilson
|align="right"|662
|align="right"|15.21%
|align="right"|-

|Independent
|Peter J. Semko
|align="right"|99
|align="right"|2.27%
|align="right"|-23.94
|- bgcolor="white"
!align="left" colspan=3|Total
!align="right"|4,352
!align="right"|100.00%
!align="right"|

|-

|CCF
|Dmytro Lazorko
|align="right"|2,357
|align="right"|42.31%
|align="right"|-10.68
 
|Prog. Conservative
|Robert C. Glen
|align="right"|643
|align="right"|11.54%
|align="right"|-3.67
|- bgcolor="white"
!align="left" colspan=3|Total
!align="right"|5,571
!align="right"|100.00%
!align="right"|

|-

|style="width: 130px"|CCF
|Dmytro Zipchen
|align="right"|3,208
|align="right"|50.27%
|align="right"|+7.96

|- bgcolor="white"
!align="left" colspan=3|Total
!align="right"|6,382
!align="right"|100.00%
!align="right"|

|-

|CCF
|Dmytro Zipchen
|align="right"|2,482
|align="right"|40.63%
|align="right"|-9.64

|- bgcolor="white"
!align="left" colspan=3|Total
!align="right"|6,109
!align="right"|100.00%
!align="right"|

|-

|style="width: 130px"|CCF
|Dick Michayluk
|align="right"|2,358
|align="right"|41.23%
|align="right"|+0.60

 
|Prog. Conservative
|Walter J. Dolynny
|align="right"|765
|align="right"|13.37%
|align="right"|-

|- bgcolor="white"
!align="left" colspan=3|Total
!align="right"|5,720
!align="right"|100.00%
!align="right"|

|-

|style="width: 130px"|CCF
|Dick Michayluk
|align="right"|2,200
|align="right"|40.51%
|align="right"|-0.72

 
|Prog. Conservative
|Walter J. Dolynny
|align="right"|1,238
|align="right"|22.79%
|align="right"|+9.42
|- bgcolor="white"
!align="left" colspan=3|Total
!align="right"|5,431
!align="right"|100.00%
!align="right"|

|-

|style="width: 130px"|NDP
|Dick Michayluk
|align="right"|2,365
|align="right"|45.33%
|align="right"|+4.82

 
|Prog. Conservative
|Ed Thunderchild
|align="right"|510
|align="right"|9.77%
|align="right"|-13.02
|- bgcolor="white"
!align="left" colspan=3|Total
!align="right"|5,218
!align="right"|100.00%
!align="right"|

|-

|style="width: 130px"|NDP
|Dick Michayluk
|align="right"|2,356
|align="right"|49.99%
|align="right"|+4.66

 
|Prog. Conservative
|Dale Ebert
|align="right"|375
|align="right"|7.96%
|align="right"|-1.81
|- bgcolor="white"
!align="left" colspan=3|Total
!align="right"|4,713
!align="right"|100.00%
!align="right"|

|-

|style="width: 130px"|NDP
|Dennis Banda
|align="right"|2,783
|align="right"|42.02%
|align="right"|-7.97

 
|Progressive Conservative
|Nick E. Kowerchuk
|align="right"|1,835
|align="right"|27.70%
|align="right"|+19.74
|- bgcolor="white"
!align="left" colspan=3|Total
!align="right"|6,624
!align="right"|100.00%
!align="right"|

|-

|style="width: 130px"|NDP
|Dennis Banda
|align="right"|3,325
|align="right"|49.39%
|align="right"|+7.37
 
|Progressive Conservative
|John Gerich
|align="right"|2,916
|align="right"|43.32%
|align="right"|+15.62

|- bgcolor="white"
!align="left" colspan=3|Total
!align="right"|6,732
!align="right"|100.00%
!align="right"|

|-
 
|style="width: 130px"|Progressive Conservative
|John Gerich
|align="right"|4,018
|align="right"|57.13%
|align="right"|+13.81

|NDP
|Dennis Banda
|align="right"|2,556
|align="right"|36.34%
|align="right"|-13.05

|- bgcolor="white"
!align="left" colspan=3|Total
!align="right"|7,033
!align="right"|100.00%
!align="right"|

|-
 
|style="width: 130px"|Progressive Conservative
|John Gerich
|align="right"|3,591
|align="right"|53.91%
|align="right"|-3.22

|NDP
|Dennis Banda
|align="right"|2,791
|align="right"|41.90%
|align="right"|+5.56

|- bgcolor="white"
!align="left" colspan=3|Total
!align="right"|6,661
!align="right"|100.00%
!align="right"|

|-

|style="width: 130px"|NDP
|Walt Jess
|align="right"|3,493
|align="right"|44.30%
|align="right"|+2.40
 
|Prog. Conservative
|John Gerich
|align="right"|3,206
|align="right"|40.67%
|align="right"|-13.24

|- bgcolor="white"
!align="left" colspan=3|Total
!align="right"|7,884
!align="right"|100.00%
!align="right"|

|-

|style="width: 130px"|NDP
|Walt Jess
|align="right"|3,232
|align="right"|42.94%
|align="right"|-1.36

 
|Prog. Conservative
|Ron Meakin
|align="right"|2,133
|align="right"|28.34%
|align="right"|-12.33
|- bgcolor="white"
!align="left" colspan=3|Total
!align="right"|7,527
!align="right"|100.00%
!align="right"|

|-

|NDP
|Walt Jess
|align="right"|2,444
|align="right"|32.38%
|align="right"|-10.56

|- bgcolor="white"
!align="left" colspan=3|Total
!align="right"|7,548
!align="right"|100.00%
!align="right"|

See also
Electoral district (Canada)
List of Saskatchewan provincial electoral districts
List of Saskatchewan general elections
List of political parties in Saskatchewan
Redberry Lake
Rural Municipality of Redberry No. 435
Hafford, Saskatchewan

References
 Saskatchewan Archives Board – Saskatchewan Election Results By Electoral Division

Former provincial electoral districts of Saskatchewan